The Body in the Library is a work of detective fiction by Agatha Christie and first published in the US by Dodd, Mead and Company in February 1942 and in UK by the Collins Crime Club in May of the same year. The US edition retailed at $2.00 and the UK edition at seven shillings and sixpence. The novel features her fictional amateur detective, Miss Marple.

Plot summary
The maid at Gossington Hall wakes Mrs Bantry, “There is a body in the library!” she cries. Dolly Bantry then wakes her husband, Colonel Arthur Bantry to go downstairs. He finds the dead body of a young woman on the hearth rug in the library. She had been painted with heavy makeup, platinum-blonde hair, and a silver-spangled dress. The colonel then contacts the police and Mrs Bantry calls Miss Marple, (an old friend of hers). The police investigators include Colonel Melchett and Inspector Slack.

Trying to identify this dead young  woman, Melchett heads to the nearby cottage of Basil Blake, but Blake's girlfriend Dinah Lee, a platinum blonde, is very much alive and arrives at the house while Melchett is interviewing Blake. Dr Haydock’s autopsy reveals that the young woman, healthy but not fully mature, died between 10 pm and 12 midnight the previous evening, had been drugged and then strangled, and was not sexually molested. Miss Marple notices that the appearance of this girl is not right, from her bitten fingernails to her old dress. She shares these observations with Dolly.

Hotel guest Conway Jefferson reports Ruby Keene, an 18-year-old dancer at the Majestic Hotel in Danemouth, as missing. Josie Turner, employee at the hotel, identifies the body as that of her cousin Ruby. Guests saw Ruby as late as 11 pm dancing with George Bartlett, but Ruby did not appear for her dance demonstration at midnight. Conway tells police he has revised his will to favour Ruby, until the legal adoption is completed.

Dolly and Miss Marple move to the Majestic to investigate further. Conway calls Sir Henry Clithering to join the investigation; Sir Henry sees Miss Marple at the hotel and in turn invites her to investigate.

Conway made large financial settlements for his children at the time each married. Then his wife, son and daughter were killed in an aeroplane crash eight years earlier. The three grieving survivors, son-in-law Mark, daughter-in-law Adelaide, and Conway, made up a household. They were playing bridge that evening with Josie. Police initially rule out the son-in-law and daughter-in-law, thinking each one is  financially secure. But both are short of money, as Slack’s investigation and Adelaide’s conversation with Dolly reveal.

Bartlett's burned-out car is found with a charred corpse inside. From one shoe and one button, the corpse is identified as that of 16-year-old Girl Guide Pamela Reeves, reported missing by her parents the night before.

The police ask Miss Marple to interview the other girls at the Guides event, and ask Sir Henry to question Conway's valet, Edwards. Miss Marple learns from friend Florence that Pamela had been approached by a film producer and offered a screen test that evening, which was why she did not go directly home. Edwards reports that he saw a snapshot of Basil Blake fall out of Ruby's handbag while she was with Conway, which points to Blake. Slack had already found the hearth rug from the Blake home dumped.

Miss Marple believes that she knows who the murderer is, and seeks proof of her deduction. She visits Dinah Lee; Basil returns home, and he reveals how he found the corpse on the hearth rug around midnight when he came home rather drunk after a party. He moved the corpse to the Bantry home, not liking Bantry much. He did not kill the girl. The police arrest him.

Back at the hotel, Miss Marple asks the Bantrys to find a marriage record at Somerset House. She asks Sir Henry to approach Conway; Conway agrees to tell Mark and Adelaide that he will change his will the next day, leaving his money to a hostel in London. Sir Henry alerts the police, and shows the marriage record for Mark and Josie. At 3 am, an intruder, Josie Turner, enters Conway’s bedroom, and is caught in the act by the police before she can harm Conway with the syringe filled with digitalin.

Miss Marple explains her thinking to Conway and the police. The body in the library was Pamela Reeves, made up to look more or less like Ruby, with her bitten fingernails giving away her youth. Ruby was the one burned in the car. Thus the alibis at the hotel were useless. Miss Marple did not believe the identification by Josie (“people are far too trusting for this wicked world”) and sensed a plan gone awry.

She suspected that Mark and Josie were married. Besides wanting Conway dead, upon learning that Conway planned to adopt Ruby, they made the double murder plan. Mark lured Pamela to the hotel for the fictitious screen test. Josie dressed her, dyed her hair, and made her up to resemble Ruby, then drugged her. During the bridge game, Mark took a break, taking the drugged Pamela to Blake's hearth rug, where he strangled her with her belt. Just before midnight, when Ruby went up to change for the exhibition dance, Josie followed her and killed her by injection or a blow. After the midnight dance, she took Ruby, dressed in Pamela’s clothes, in Bartlett's car to the quarry where she set fire to the car. During the police interrogation, Mark breaks down and confesses all the details.

Adelaide says she has agreed to marry her long-time suitor, Hugo, which pleases Conway. His new will settles cash on Adelaide and leaves the rest to her son Peter.

Characters
Miss Marple: resident of village of Saint Mary Mead who has much experience in solving murders.
Colonel Melchett: Chief Constable of Radfordshire, where the first body is found. 
Dolly Bantry: a friend of her village neighbour Miss Marple.
Colonel Arthur Bantry: retired soldier, husband of Dolly, and owner of extensive lands.
Inspector Slack: investigates both murders and makes an arrest. Despite his last name, he is thorough in his work.
Dr Haydock: doctor who performs the post-mortem on the first body, found in the Bantrys' library.
 Conway Jefferson: wealthy man staying at the Majestic Hotel with his son-in-law, daughter-in-law and step-grandson. He lost his legs in an aeroplane crash, the same crash in which he lost his wife Margaret, son Frank, and daughter Rosamund some years earlier. He is an old friend of the Bantrys.
Mark Gaskell: Rosamund Jefferson's widower. He is a smooth talking and handsome man, a gambler by personality. He lives with his father-in-law in the shared grief after the plane crash, but his father-in-law never really liked his daughter’s choice of husband.
 Adelaide Jefferson: Frank Jefferson's widow. She has a son, Peter Carmody, who is aged 9. Peter was born after the death of her first husband, Mike Carmody. She is a good mother and a reliable woman.
Edwards: valet to Conway Jefferson. He agrees to speak with Clithering, who will share only the needed information with police.
Ruby Keene: a dancer using that stage name, born Rosy Legge. Conway Jefferson likes her, going so far as to say he will adopt her and make her his heir once he alters his will. She was raised poor, and her outward appearance was like his daughter Rosamund. She was unlike Rosamund in personality, as Ruby was a gold-digger.
Josie Turner: Ruby's cousin, a professional dancer, who asked Ruby to come to the hotel to take her place on the dance floor while her ankle heals after an injury. She is shrewd, practical, and wants money.
Raymond Starr: born Thomas Ramon Starr. He works as the tennis pro and dancer at the Majestic Hotel. He has hopes to woo Adelaide, once she is ready to consider remarriage. He loses out graciously.
Sir Henry Clithering: retired head of Scotland Yard and friend to Miss Marple. He is called to help in the investigation by his friend Conway Jefferson.
Superintendent Harper: from the police in Glenshire, where the hotel is located. He joins the investigation.
Basil Blake: young man who recently moved into a cottage just outside St Mary Mead, and enjoys scorning the older generation. He works for a film studio about 30 miles away, and appears at the house mainly at weekends. Miss Marple knows of his earlier life as an ARP warden who saved lives in a burning building, getting injured in the process. This is the only allusion to World War II.
Dinah Lee: woman with platinum blonde hair who appears at Blake’s home. They are married but tell no one in the village. 
George Bartlett: Ruby's last dance partner. He has a car parked at the hotel which is stolen and reported missing the morning after Ruby’s murder. He is a shy man.
Pamela Reeves: Local girl, aged 16 and a Girl Guide. She attended a Guides event on the night Ruby was murdered; her parents reported her missing to the police at 9 pm, hours after she was due home. The next day she is named as the corpse found in Bartlett’s stolen and burned car.
Florence Small: Pamela Reeves's friend, in whom she confided the story of the screen test at the hotel. Florence gave away her nervousness to Miss Marple, who chose her as the girl to ask what really happened that evening. 
Hugo McClean: long time friend of Adelaide who wanted to marry her. In the end, he did.

Title
In her Author's Foreword, Christie describes "the body in the library" as a cliché of detective fiction. She states that when writing her own variation on this theme, she decided that the library should be a completely conventional one while the body would be a highly improbable and sensational one.

Another example of this cliché was included in the first episode of the second series ("And the Moonbeams Kiss the Sea") of the television series Inspector Lewis, in which the body of a handyman is found in the Bodleian Library. DS James Hathaway comments to DI Robbie Lewis, "You realise what we've got, don't you, sir. ... The body in the library."

Yet more recently, in Philip Pullman's novel La Belle Sauvage, published in 2017, the protagonist borrows a book titled The Body in the Library.

In light of these remarks, this novel can be considered a conscious reworking of the genre.

Literary significance and reception
Maurice Willson Disher of The Times Literary Supplement was impressed in his review of 16 May 1942 with the female view of life injected into the solution of the crimes. "Some devoted souls may sigh for Hercule Poirot, but there are bound to be others who will be glad to find his place taken in the 'new Agatha Christie' by Miss Marple. What this relief signifies is that professional detectives are no match for elderly spinsters (not all so elderly), with some training in looking under the antimacassar, who are now very much in fashion. Even while making full allowance for this we find it hard not to be impressed by old-maid logic. When Miss Marple says, 'The dress was all wrong,' she is plainly observing facts hidden from the masculine eye – facts which are of a very lively interest. The Body in the Library should turn Hendon College co-educational."

Maurice Richardson was not as impressed with Christie's efforts in his 17 May 1942 review in The Observer when he concluded, "Ingenious, of course, but interest is rather diffuse and the red herrings have lost their phosphorescence."

An unnamed reviewer in the Toronto Daily Star (21 March 1942) wrote that "It doesn't take long to read this one, but the two killings in it are made so mysterious that you will not want to lay the book down until the killer is caught." The reviewer concludes, "Police do a lot of probing, but it is the shrewd reasoning – intuition perhaps – of Jane Marple that finds the missing link and discloses a diabolical plot."

Robert Barnard had a positive view of this novel, writing in 1990. He calls the plot situation classic rather than cliché. It was a "bravura performance on a classic situation." The shift of locations of action, from Miss Marple's village to a seaside resort hotel, were good for the story, "St Mary Mead regulars figure in the case, pleasantly diversified by fashionable seaside hotel guests and the film crowd." The question he raised involves the likelihood of the crimes and the manner of solving them, which he found better than a mystery written over 30 years later by another author, saying that "If you think what happens to the body after death is unlikely, try the more 'realistic' P.D. James' An Unsuitable Job for a Woman."

Allusions
In Chapter 8 the author gives herself a mention from the mouth of the young boy, Peter Carmody. Explaining that he enjoys reading detective stories, Peter says that he has the autographs of Christie, Dorothy L. Sayers, John Dickson Carr and H. C. Bailey.

In Chapter 9 Colonel Melchett states that "there's still one thing to be done. Cherchez l'homme." It is referred to as a joke in the book, and is possibly a reference to Hercule Poirot, Christie's other famous sleuth. However, it is more likely a reference to the popular phrase 'cherchez la femme''', meaning that there is frequently a woman behind a man's behaviour and motives in detective stories; since in this novel the victim was a girl, who was presumed to have a male lover, the phrase was changed jokingly by the detective.

While explaining how she concluded who the murderers were and how the widowed Mr Jefferson became so quickly enamoured of a girl while knowing so little of her, Miss Marple mentioned the old story The King and the Beggar-maid as a model for instant emotional reaction. All the other characters in the novel were found to act like someone she knew from life in her village.

In Christie's Cards on the Table, published six years earlier, Anne Meredith knows Ariadne Oliver as the writer of a book called The Body in the Library.

Film, TV, Radio or theatrical adaptations

Television

BBC adaptation
The 1984 television film The Body in the Library was part of the BBC series of Miss Marple, with Joan Hickson making the first of her appearances in the role of Jane Marple. The adaptation was transmitted in three parts between 26–28 December 1984, and only had a few changes made to it from the novel:
 The character of Superintendent Harper was omitted.
 Bartlett's car was changed from a Minoan 14 to a Vauxhall Coaster.
 The amount of money left to Ruby was changed from £50,000 to £100,000.

ITV adaptation
A second adaptation of the novel was made in 2004 by ITV, as part of its ongoing Agatha Christie's Marple series. This adaptation starred Geraldine McEwan as Miss Marple, James Fox as Colonel Bantry, Joanna Lumley as Dolly Bantry, Ian Richardson as Conway Jefferson, and Jamie Theakston as Mark Gaskell.  While this adaptation was largely faithful to the original novel, there were several changes:
 Josie's accomplice and lover is Jefferson’s daughter-in-law Adelaide, not his son-in-law Mark Gaskell as in the novel.
 The date is changed to after World War II, with two related changes:
 Conway's wife and children were killed by a V-2 strike, not in a plane crash (this is shown in a prologue scene).
 Mark, Frank, and Peter's father Mike were all RAF pilots in the war. 
 The characters of Clithering, Edwards, and McLean are omitted.
 Conway sees the snapshot of Blake that falls out of Ruby's handbag.
 The drugging of the first victim is revealed later.
 Miss Marple's explanation of the crime comes before the trap to catch the killers, rather than after.

French adaptation
A third adaptation appeared as the ninth episode of French television series Les Petits Meurtres d'Agatha Christie. The episode first aired in 2011.

Korean adaptation
A fourth adaptation aired as part of the 2018 Korean television series, Ms. Ma, Nemesis.

Radio
A radio adaptation was produced for BBC Radio 4 in 1999. The production was dramatised by Michael Bakewell and directed by Enyd Williams.

The cast list featured June Whitfield as Miss Marple, Richard Todd as Colonel Melchett, Pauline Jameson as Dolly Bantry, Jack Watling as Colonel Bantry, Graham Crowden as Sir Henry Clithering, and Ben Crowe as George Bartlett.

Publication history

 1941, Dodd Mead and Company (New York), February 1942, Hardback, 245 pp
 1941, Collins Crime Club (London), May 1942, Hardback, 160 pp
 1946, Pocket Books (New York), Paperback, (Pocket number 341), 152 pp
 1953, Penguin Books, Paperback, (Penguin number 924), 190 pp
 1959, Pan Books, Paperback, 157 pp (Great Pan G221)
 1962, Fontana Books (Imprint of HarperCollins), Paperback, 191 pp
 1972, Ulverscroft Large-print Edition, Hardcover, 305 pp; 
 2005, Marple Facsimile edition (Facsimile of 1942 UK first edition), 7 November 2005, Hardcover; 

The novel was first serialised in the US in The Saturday Evening Post'' in seven parts from 10 May (Volume 213, Number 45) to 21 June 1941 (Volume 213, Number 51) with illustrations by Hy Rubin.

References

External links
The Body in the Library at the official Agatha Christie website

1942 British novels
Miss Marple novels
Novels first published in serial form
Works originally published in The Saturday Evening Post
Novels set in Hampshire
Dodd, Mead & Co. books
British novels adapted into television shows
British novels adapted into films
Fiction about child murder